Savickas is the masculine form of a Lithuanian family name derived from the Slavic surname Savitsky. Its feminine forms  are: Savickienė (married woman or widow) and Savickaitė (unmarried woman).

Notable people with this surname include:
 Žydrūnas Savickas (born 1975), Lithuanian strongman
 Arūnas Savickas (born 1975), Lithuanian swimmer
 Frank Savickas (1935-2001), American politician

See also 
 Savickis

Lithuanian-language surnames